"Feels Just Like It Should" is the first single from British funk and acid jazz band Jamiroquai's sixth studio album, Dynamite (2005). The song was produced by Mike Spencer and Jay Kay. The track was built on a bass line created by Kay as a human beatbox. This bassline originally formed part of an interlude that was intended to feature on the band's 2001 album, A Funk Odyssey, but it was dropped for the final version of the album, only appearing on the test pressing. The song was their fourth number one on the US Dance Chart and peaked at number eight on the UK Singles Chart. It was nominated for a Grammy Award for Best Short Form Music Video at the 48th Grammy Awards.

Background
This track has been used by the BBC's advertising for the 2005 Children in Need appeal, which features Terry Wogan breakdancing to the song, was included in the computer game FIFA 06, and was featured in Need for Speed: Most Wanted as a remix by Timo Maas. It has also been used in a Cingular Music and Payless ShoeSource advertisement, and is available as a playable song in the Xbox 360 game, Dance Dance Revolution Universe also the Xbox game Dancing Stage Unleashed 3. It was also used during a game montage for the Xbox 360 during E3 2006. The song was also used in 2010 during commercials for PlayStation Move and the HBO series Hung.

Music video
The video shows a nerd (played by Jay Kay) entering into an elevator. The elevator takes him to a strange area (the number bar on the elevator reads "hell"), where the nerd turns into Jay Kay. He walks down a street, and into an alley, where he meets a pimp (also played by Jay Kay), who is the "candyman" mentioned in the lyrics. He plays several mind tricks on Jay Kay. Jay Kay's reactions almost exactly fit in with the lyrics; for example, with the line I'm throwing out my laser beams, he shoots lasers at a laser-shooting woman, and with I pick a little free agent, he picks up a dwarf secret agent (Jason Acuña) who shoots the woman but gets thrown away. As the video progresses, Jay Kay rides down the street on a skateboard, and he sees the candyman driving the car, with a lady wearing a red dress as a passenger. He goes into a phone booth and presumably calls his wife or someone else. Then he transforms back into the nerd, who enters a room with the lady, and she tries having sex with him. For a brief moment in the video, the woman appears to be Jay Kay dressed up. The video ends with the nerd lying in an alley.

Track listings
UK CD1
 "Feels Just Like It Should" – 4:34
 "Feels So Good" (Knee Deep Remix) – 3:44

UK CD2
 "Feels Just Like It Should" – 4:34
 "Feels Just Like It Should" (Mark Ronson Remix) – 3:49
 "Feels Just Like It Should" (Timo Maas Remix) – 9:31

Charts

Release history

See also
 List of number-one dance singles of 2005 (U.S.)

References

Jamiroquai songs
2005 singles
2005 songs
Epic Records singles
Music videos directed by Joseph Kahn
Songs written by Jason Kay
Songs written by Matt Johnson (keyboardist)
Sony BMG singles